Paola Cavallino (born 6 June 1977 in Genoa) is a butterfly swimmer from Italy, who won the silver medal in the women's 200 metres butterfly event at the 2004 European Championships. She represented her native country a couple of months later at the 2004 Summer Olympics in Athens, Greece.

References
 Profile

Italian female swimmers
Swimmers at the 2004 Summer Olympics
Swimmers at the 2008 Summer Olympics
Olympic swimmers of Italy
Sportspeople from Genoa
1977 births
Living people
European Aquatics Championships medalists in swimming
Mediterranean Games gold medalists for Italy
Swimmers at the 1997 Mediterranean Games
Universiade medalists in swimming
Mediterranean Games medalists in swimming
Universiade silver medalists for Italy
Medalists at the 2003 Summer Universiade